The 2006 European Athletics Indoor Cup was held on 5 March 2006 at the Stade Couvert Régional in Liévin, France. It was the third edition of the indoor track and field meeting for international teams, which featured the six top performing nations from the 2005 European Cup and the top two from the European Cup First League. Great Britain's women's team withdrew due to the Commonwealth Games in Melbourne, while the Italian women also withdrew as the dates coincided with their indoor national championships. The event was held a week prior to the 2006 IAAF World Indoor Championships in Moscow.

The competition featured nineteen athletics events ten for men and nine for women. The 400 metres race were held in a dual final format due to size constraints, with athletes' being assigned final positions through their finishing times. The international team points totals were decided by their athletes' finishing positions, with each representative's performance contributing towards their national overall score. The Russian women won the competition for a third consecutive time, holding a sixteen-point margin over runners-up Poland. The French men's team also repeated as champions, having won in 2004. Germany were the men's second placed team, while Spain just edged Poland into the third place spot.

The competition venue is also the annual host of the Meeting Pas de Calais.

Results summary

Men

Women

Medal table
Key

References

Results
European Indoor Cup. GBR Athletics/Athletics Weekly. Retrieved on 2011-01-26.
European Athletics Indoor Cup Liévin 2006. European Athletics. Retrieved on 2011-01-26.

External links
Official website (archived)
Images from the competition

2006 Indoor
European Indoor Cup
International athletics competitions hosted by France
European Athletics Indoor Cup
European Athletics Indoor Cup